Mitchell Kupchak (born May 24, 1954) is an American professional basketball executive and retired player. He is the current president of basketball operations and general manager of the Charlotte Hornets of the National Basketball Association (NBA). As a college player, Kupchak was an All-American at the University of North Carolina and a member of the gold medal-winning 1976 United States Olympic team. As a professional player, he won three NBA titles – one as a member of the Washington Bullets and two with the Los Angeles Lakers.

High school and college career
Kupchak played for Brentwood High School in New York. He was an All-American on the North Carolina Tar Heels men's basketball team, and was named Atlantic Coast Conference Player of the Year in his senior season. Kupchak played on the gold medal-winning team at the 1976 Summer Olympics in Montreal.

NBA career
Kupchak was drafted by the Washington Bullets in 1976 and was named to the NBA All-Rookie Team. He had four productive seasons with Washington and was part of the team that won the NBA championship in 1978. He signed a long term contract with the Lakers in 1981 at the behest of Earvin "Magic" Johnson, who told owner Jerry Buss, "If we could get Mitch Kupchak, I know we could win", after the team's playoff upset. 26 games into the season, Kupchak injured his knee and did not play again until the 1983–84 season.

Kupchak played a key role in the Showtime Lakers' 1985 championship team against the Boston Celtics, who had intimidated them in the prior year's Finals. Kupchak retired after the 1985–86 season, having played 510 regular season and 68 playoff games, with regular season averages of 10.2 points per game and 5.4 rebounds per game (7.7 points per game and 4.7 rebounds per game in the playoffs). During his final game, Game 5 of the Western Conference Finals, a brawl broke out between the Lakers and the Houston Rockets, which saw Kupchak and Hakeem Olajuwon ejected.

Transition to NBA management
Kupchak planned for his "life after" being an NBA player and pursued a focused program to learn the trade of running NBA team operations. While still under his initial player contract, he worked with the front office, developing strong working relationships with Laker management, beginning to "apprentice" with Jerry West, and starting studies that led to his MBA from the UCLA Anderson School of Management in 1987.

As general manager
Kupchak retired from playing in 1986, and became the Lakers' assistant general manager (under GM and Basketball Hall of Famer Jerry West). He later succeeded West as General Manager, but was not considered to have all of the traditional powers of an NBA GM until 2000 (when West resigned as Vice President of Basketball Operations, for the challenge of trying to replicate the Lakers' level of success as GM of the recently relocated, last-place Memphis Grizzlies).

On July 16, 2003, after the Lakers failed to reach the NBA Finals for the first time in three years, Kupchak's first major deal was the off-season acquisitions of superstars Karl Malone and Gary Payton (who had both failed to win an NBA championship despite long, Hall of Fame-caliber careers). After a number of controversial trade transactions over the years, including the trade of Shaquille O'Neal to the Miami Heat for Lamar Odom, Caron Butler, and Brian Grant—as well as the decision to not trade young center Andrew Bynum for point guard Jason Kidd—Kupchak faced severe criticism from Lakers franchise star Kobe Bryant, who urged his firing. However, Kupchak reportedly still had the support of the team's owner. 

In 2007, Kupchak traded Brian Cook and Maurice Evans for Trevor Ariza, and the Lakers started the season off with the best record in the West. After an injury to Andrew Bynum cast their recent success in doubt, his February 2008 deal to obtain Spanish power forward Pau Gasol from the Memphis Grizzlies for Kwame Brown, Javaris Crittenton, Aaron McKie, and draft picks (one of which was the right to Marc Gasol) earned him praise (and scorn) from league insiders and fans alike. Bryant later conceded, "He goes from a F to an A-plus.", while Gregg Popovich, coach of Western Conference rival San Antonio Spurs, went so far as to argue that "there should be a trade committee that can scratch all trades that make no sense". That year, the Lakers reached the NBA Finals for the 5th time in 9 years, but would eventually lose to the Boston Celtics. The following year, they returned and won in a 4-1 rout over the Orlando Magic.

In 2009, Kupchak signed 2004 Defensive Player of the Year Ron Artest, famous for his role in the Pacers-Pistons Brawl, as a free agent. The Lakers made it to their seventh NBA Finals in 11 years, winning in a championship re-match against the Celtics in the 2010 NBA Finals. 2011 saw the retirement of longtime coach Phil Jackson, replacing him with Mike Brown, as well as an attempted three-team trade of Odom and Gasol to the Houston Rockets, in exchange for the New Orleans Hornets' All-Star point guard, Chris Paul Because the Hornets (a financial failure for its previous owners) was still owned by the NBA, Commissioner David Stern vetoed the trade for unspecified "basketball reasons"—leaving the Lakers with a publicly disgruntled Odom, and shocked Gasol (both of whom intended to end their careers as Lakers, and had not known that they were about to be traded).

On July 4, 2012, after two consecutive playoff exits in the Western Conference semi-final round, Kupchak used a traded player exception (gained by trading Odom to the Dallas Mavericks) on two-time, former NBA Most Valuable Player, Steve Nash. The deal to get Nash in a Laker uniform was finalized for a package of future draft picks and cash considerations. That same summer, Kupchak dealt Andrew Bynum, who had just been voted to his first All-Star team, in a four-way trade for his Eastern Conference counterpart, three-time Defensive Player of the Year Dwight Howard. The move was announced August 10, 2012. But the flurry of personnel changes did not stop there: Kupchak had also convinced former All-Star and Sixth Man of the Year winner Antawn Jamison to sign for a veteran-minimum contract. He later, along with owner Jerry Buss and Vice President of Basketball Operations Jim Buss (Jerry's son), also fired defense-minded head coach Mike Brown and replaced him with Nash's former head coach, offense-minded Mike D'Antoni.

During the 2013–14 season, Kupchak and the Lakers gave Kobe Bryant a 2-year, $48.5 million extension despite him being out due to an Achilles injury. The deal was reportedly endorsed by team president Jeanie Buss. Mike D'Antoni resigned after the season, leaving Kupchak and Jim Buss the task of hiring a 3rd coach in 4 years. They decided on former Lakers point guard Byron Scott. The Lakers announced in April 2014 that Kupchak's own contract had been extended for multiple years. It was scheduled to expire after the 2014 season. Terms of the contract were not released.

On February 21, 2017, Kupchak was fired as general manager of the Lakers. On April 8, 2018, Kupchak was hired as the president of basketball operations and general manager of the Charlotte Hornets. On June 21, 2018, Kupchak made his first draft selection as the general manager of the Charlotte Hornets. He selected Shai Gilgeous-Alexander with the 11th pick, who was subsequently traded to the Los Angeles Clippers for Miles Bridges, who was selected with the 12th pick.

Personal life
Kupchak was inducted into the Suffolk Sports Hall of Fame on Long Island in the Basketball Category with the Class of 1990. In 2002, he was inducted into the National Polish-American Sports Hall of Fame. He is married to Claire, with whom he had two children. His daughter, Alina Claire Kupchak, died on January 5, 2015, after a lengthy illness. His son Maxwell played as a forward for the UC Santa Barbara basketball team.

See also 
List of National Basketball Association team presidents

References

External links

1954 births
Living people
All-American college men's basketball players
American men's basketball players
American people of Polish descent
Basketball players at the 1976 Summer Olympics
Basketball players from New York (state)
Brentwood High School (Brentwood, New York) alumni
Centers (basketball)
Charlotte Hornets executives
Los Angeles Lakers executives
Los Angeles Lakers players
Medalists at the 1976 Summer Olympics
National Basketball Association general managers
North Carolina Tar Heels men's basketball players
Olympic gold medalists for the United States in basketball
People from Hicksville, New York
Power forwards (basketball)
Sportspeople from Nassau County, New York
UCLA Anderson School of Management alumni
United States men's national basketball team players
Washington Bullets draft picks
Washington Bullets players